When I Saw You (translit. Lamma Shoftak) is a 2012 Palestinian drama film directed by Annemarie Jacir. The film was selected as the Palestinian entry for the Best Foreign Language Oscar at the 85th Academy Awards. It won Best Asian Film at the 63rd Berlin International Film Festival, NETPAC award.

Cast
 Mahmoud Asfa as Tarek
 Ruba Blal as Ghaydaa
 Saleh Bakri as Layth
 Anas Algaralleh as Mr. Nasser
 Ali Elayan as Abu Akram
 Ruba Shamshoum as Zain
 Ahmad Srour as Touissant
 Firas W. Taybeh as Majed

Accolades

See also
 List of submissions to the 85th Academy Awards for Best Foreign Language Film
 List of Palestinian submissions for the Academy Award for Best Foreign Language Film

References

External links
 
 

2012 films
2012 drama films
Palestinian drama films
Jordanian drama films
2010s Arabic-language films